William Walter Webb (November 20, 1857 – January 15, 1933), was the sixth Bishop of Milwaukee, from 1906 till 1933.

Early life and education
Webb was born in Germantown, Pennsylvania, on November 20, 1857, the son of William Hewitt Webb and Esther Odin. He was baptized on January 6, 1858. He was educated at the Episcopal Academy in Philadelphia, and then at the University of Pennsylvania. He left the University of Pennsylvania in his junior year to attend Trinity College in Hartford, Connecticut, from where he graduated with the a Bachelor of Arts and a Bachelor of Science in 1882. In 1885 he obtained his Master of Arts from Trinity College, whilst also studying at Berkeley Divinity School from where he graduated in 1885. He was made a Doctor of Divinity in 1897 and a Doctor of Law in 1925, by Nashotah House.

Ordained Ministry
Webb was ordained deacon on June 3, 1885, by Bishop William Woodruff Niles of New Hampshire. On November 10, 1886, he was ordained to the priesthood by John Williams, Bishop of Connecticut. He became assistant at the Church of the Evangelists in Philadelphia. In 1889 he became rector of St Elisabeth's Church in Philadelphia, while in 1892, he was elected Professor of Dogmatic Theology at Nashotah House. In 1897 he was elected as President of Nashotah House. He also served as president of the Standing Committee of the Diocese of Milwaukee, and was its delegate to the General Convention of 1898.

Bishop
Webb was elected Coadjutor Bishop of Milwaukee on during a special council on November 21, 1905. He was consecrated in All Saints' Cathedral on February 24, 1906, and succeeded as diocesan bishop upon Isaac Lea Nicholson's death on October 29, 1906. Like his predecessor, Webb promoted the Catholic heritage of the Episcopal Church. He remained in office till his death in 1933.

External links
 Documents by and about Webb from Project Canterbury
Grave at the Church of St. James the Less, Philadelphia

References

1857 births
1933 deaths
Religious leaders from Milwaukee
Nashotah House faculty
20th-century Anglican bishops in the United States
Episcopal bishops of Milwaukee
Trinity College (Connecticut) alumni
Clergy from Philadelphia
Burials at the Church of St. James the Less